George Kremer (November 21, 1775September 11, 1854) was a member of the United States House of Representatives from Pennsylvania.

Biography
Born in Middletown in the Province of Pennsylvania on November 21, 1775, Kremer studied law, was admitted to the bar and began his legal practice in Lewisburg, Pennsylvania.

A member of the Pennsylvania House of Representatives in 1812 and 1813, Kremer was elected as a Jackson Republican to the Eighteenth Congress and reelected as a Jacksonian to the Nineteenth and Twentieth Congresses. 

Kremer died in Middleburg, Pennsylvania, and was interred in the private burial ground on his family estate near Middleburg, Pennsylvania.

Legacy
Kremer is best remembered for publishing (and later defending) an anonymous letter in the Philadelphia newspaper, Columbian Observer, in which he accused Henry Clay of having made a "bargain" with John Quincy Adams to throw Clay's support to Adams in the Presidential election of 1824 (which was decided in the House of Representatives) in exchange for being given the position of Secretary of State. Kremer's letter charged that Clay had first made the offer to Andrew Jackson, who had refused it. Clay vigorously disputed the allegations and demanded an official House investigation, during which Kremer refused to testify. The "Corrupt Bargain" charge continued to haunt Clay for the remainder of his political career.

Bibliography
Russ, William A., Jr. The Political Ideas of George Kremer. Pennsylvania History 7 (October 1940): 201–12.

References

 

1775 births
1854 deaths
Members of the Pennsylvania House of Representatives
Democratic-Republican Party members of the United States House of Representatives from Pennsylvania
Jacksonian members of the United States House of Representatives from Pennsylvania
19th-century American politicians
People from Middletown, Pennsylvania